Cooper Wallace (born April 26, 1982) is a former American football tight end. He was originally signed by the Chicago Bears as an undrafted free agent in 2006. He played college football at Auburn.

College and high school career
Wallace attended Auburn University, where he was a starter for three of his four seasons with the Tigers. He attended high school at Christ Presbyterian Academy in Nashville, Tennessee.

Professional career
Wallace was signed preseason with the Chicago Bears but was waived and subsequently signed with the Titans. On December 12, 2006, Wallace replaced defensive end Antwan Odom on the active roster in order to provide depth at the tight end position, since starting tight end Bo Scaife was out with an ankle injury.

After being released by the Titans at the end of the preseason in 2007, Wallace worked out for the Denver Broncos in October and eventually signed to the practice squad of the Cincinnati Bengals on November 6. He was not retained by the Bengals at the end of the 2007 season and on January 14, 2008, signed with the San Francisco 49ers. He was later released by the 49ers on August 25, 2008 to cut down their roster size.

References

External links
Auburn Tigers bio
Cincinnati Bengals bio
San Francisco 49ers bio

1982 births
Living people
People from Nashville, Tennessee
American football tight ends
Auburn Tigers football players
Chicago Bears players
Tennessee Titans players
Cincinnati Bengals players
San Francisco 49ers players